Tanglang may be,

Tanglang River
Tanglang language
Tanglang station